Artibeus anthonyi, also known as Anthony's fruit-eating bat, is an extinct species of bat from the Late Quaternary of Cuba.

Anthony's fruit-eating bat shows the greatest morphological divergence compared with extant Artibeus species.

References

Prehistoric bats
Holocene extinctions
Fossils of Cuba
Artibeus